MED-EL is a global medical technology company specializing in hearing implants and devices. They develop and manufacture products including cochlear implants, middle ear implants and bone conduction systems.  

MED-EL is a privately owned company and is run by its co-founder and CEO Ingeborg Hochmair, an internationally acclaimed scientist and researcher in the field of hearing implants. The company headquarters are in Innsbruck, Austria.

History
In the mid-1970s, Ingeborg and Erwin Hochmair were research scientists at the Technical University of Vienna, working on the development of cochlear implants. In 1977, the first microelectronic multichannel cochlear implant was implanted by Dr Kurt Burian in Vienna. Two years later in 1979, a modified version of that implant enabled a female patient to understand words and sentences without lip-reading via a small, body-worn sound processor used in a quiet environment.

In 1989, the Hochmair’s decided to create their own hearing implant company: MED-EL GmbH. As Erwin Hochmair had been awarded a professorship at the University of Innsbruck, they decided to found the company in the city and hired their first three employees in 1990. In 1991, they developed the world’s first behind-the-ear (BTE) audio processor. Instead of being attached to the body, this audio processor was worn behind the ear in the same way as a conventional hearing aid.

In 1995, MED-EL developed the CIS LINK system: an audio processor that allowed users of the Ineraid implant to use the recently developed CIS sound coding strategy, despite the fact that Ineraid had discontinued further development on their implants.

In 2003, the company acquired the Vibrant Soundbridge, a new type of active middle ear implant pioneered by American inventor Geoffrey Ball. It was MED-EL’s first non-cochlear implant product. Further non-cochlear implant products followed with the Bonebridge active bone conduction implant in 2012 and the Adhear non-surgical bone conduction system in 2017.

MED-EL operates in over 100 countries worldwide including Europe, America, the Middle East, Asia and Australia. There are around 200,000 MED-EL users around the world.

The company opened its own hearing museum, the Audioversum Science Centre, in 2013. The science centre is located in central Innsbruck.

Products

Cochlear Implants 
These were the first products to be designed and manufactured by MED-EL. They electronically stimulate the cochlea, sending sound signals to auditory nerve and onto the brain. The current models available are the Synchrony 2 implant with either the Sonnet 2 or Rondo 3 audio processor. The Synchrony 2 implant can undergo MRI scans of up to 3.0 Tesla.

Electric acoustic stimulation 
In 2005, MED-EL released their first electric acoustic stimulation system (EAS). This new type of implant combines both cochlear implant and hearing aid technology. The cochlear implant technology helps patients to hear high-pitched sounds, while the hearing aid technology helps them to hear low-pitched sounds. The current models are the Synchrony 2 for EAS implant with the Sonnet 2 EAS audio processor.

Middle ear implants 
In 2003, MED-EL acquired the Vibrant Soundbridge, a new type of middle ear implant. The implant works by vibrating the bones of the middle ear, allowing sound vibrations to pass from the middle ear to the cochlea. The current models are the VORP 503 implant and the SAMBA 2 audio processor. Inventor Geoffrey Ball still works as a technical director at MED-EL.  The company also offer passive middle ear implants — prostheses that replace one or all of the ossicles in the middle ear, again allowing sound vibrations to pass from the middle ear to the cochlea.

Bone conduction systems 
MED-EL offers two types of bone conduction systems: an implant and a non-surgical device. The Bonebridge bone conduction implant was the first implant on the market to offer direct drive stimulation of the bone through a transcutaneous device. The current models are the BCI 602 implant and the SAMBA 2 audio processor. The system was first approved in Europe in 2012.

The Adhear bone conduction device is the company’s only non-surgical hearing device. It consists of an adhesive adapter, which is placed on the skin behind the ear. The hearing device then snaps onto the adapter and transmits sound vibrations to the bones of the skull. There is currently only one model of the Adhear available.

Auditory brainstem implant 
MED-EL has been producing auditory brainstem implants since 1997. The ABI is similar in design to a cochlear implant, however the electrode array is placed on the cochlear nucleus of the brainstem, as opposed to being inserted into the cochlea.

Research and development

Hearo 
A collaboration with Swiss company CAScination helped to develop Hearo, a surgical robot designed to assist with cochlear implantation. It uses image-guided surgical planning software to plan the optimal trajectory to the cochlea. The Hearo received the CE mark in 2020.

Vestibular prosthesis 
Vestibular dysfunction can lead to a multitude of balance problems, such as falls. MED-EL is conducting research into a viable vestibular prosthesis with local partners, including the Medical University of Innsbruck and the UMIT university in Hall. Investigational devices have already been implanted in patients in Europe and the US.

Dexel 
MED-EL is developing the Dexel electrode array, which emits controlled doses of the drug dexamethasone into the cochlea to improve healing after implantation. The first six patients were implanted with the Dexel at the Hannover Medical School in Germany as part of a clinical trial in 2020.

Improved healing 
The company is researching different ways to improve healing after cochlear implantation. In 2020, MED-EL and the Paracelsus Medical University Salzburg announced a joint research agreement for the clinical testing of human umbilical cord cell-derived extracellular vesicles. The first clinical trial will take place at the Hannover Medical School in Germany.

TICI 
MED-EL is developing a totally implantable cochlear implant. This involves combining all the parts of the audio processor into the internal implant. The first patient in Europe was implanted with a TICI in September 2020 as part of a clinical trial.

Awards 
2021: Red Dot award for Rondo 3

2020: Innovator of the Year award for Synchrony cochlear implant system, Bonebridge bone conduction implant and AudioKey app

2020: Trigos award for international engagement, for healthcare projects in Bangladesh and Ivory Coast

2019: Red Dot award for Bonebridge BCI 602 implant

2014: Red Dot award for MED-EL audio processor

2013: Red Dot award for VSB QuickCheck

2004: Honorary Doctorate for Medicine (Ingeborg and Erwin Hochmair) from Technical University of Munich

References

External links
 MED-EL Website
 HearPeers Website 
 European Patent Organization 
 Cochlear Implant Online
 Research Gate
 Lasker Foundation

Technology companies established in 1990
Medical technology companies of Austria
Hearing aid manufacturers
Austrian brands